Pietro Magri (died October 1651) was a Roman Catholic prelate who served as Bishop of Policastro (1635–1651).

Biography
On 1 October 1635, Pietro Magri was appointed by Pope Urban VIII as Bishop of Policastro. On 7 October 1635, he was consecrated bishop by Francesco Maria Brancaccio, Cardinal-Priest of Santi XII Apostoli, with Giovanni Battista Altieri, Bishop Emeritus of Camerino, and Sigismondo Taddei, Bishop of Bitetto, serving as co-consecrators. He served as Bishop of Policastro until his death in October 1651.

References

External links and additional sources
 (for Chronology of Bishops) 
 (for Chronology of Bishops) 

1651 deaths
17th-century Italian Roman Catholic bishops
Bishops appointed by Pope Urban VIII